Kim Jong-hyeong (born April 13, 2002), better known mononymously as Jonghyeong, is a South Korean singer and musical actor. He is the leader of South Korean boy band DKZ. He starred in musical productions such as Equal, Dracula, and The Secret Garden.

Early life and education 
Kim Jong-hyeong was born on April 13, 2002, in Gumi, North Gyeongsang, South Korea. Jonghyeong enjoyed watching music shows when he was young which inspired him to become an idol. Before debuting, he was leading a dance club at school and was even elected as the overall vice president during his elementary days. In 2022, he entered Global Cyber University as a Broadcasting and Entertainment major.

Career

DKZ 

Jonghyeong was the fourth member to join his current label and was a trainee for several months. He officially debuted on April 24, 2019, as the youngest member of the quintet boy group, Dongkiz. In an interview, Jonghyeong mentioned Dean and Monsta X as artists he look up to the most.

On March 18, 2022, his group rebranded and changed its name to DKZ. Jonghyeong took the role of the group's leader in the absence of their former leader and member, Wondae. In May 2022, he and fellow member, Jaechan, became fixed radio DJs at KBS Cool FM's Station Z.

Solo activities 
Jonghyeong started his career in musicals in 2022. He made his theatrical debut in the musical "Equal" alongside his fellow member Kyoungyoon. It was then followed by the Korean production of "Dracula" where he was cast as Dracula's friend, Dumitru.

On February 3, 2023, Jonghyeong was announced to be part of the musical "The Secret Garden" in March.

Discography

Music credits

Filmography

Television series

Web series

Musicals

Radio shows

Awards and nominations

References

External links 

 

2002 births
Living people
K-pop singers
South Korean male singers
South Korean pop singers
21st-century South Korean male actors
21st-century South Korean male singers
South Korean male idols
People from Gumi, North Gyeongsang
21st-century South Korean male artists